Dreher may refer to:

 Dreher (surname)
 Dreher Brewery, brewery in Budapest, Hungary
 Dreher Township, Wayne County, Pennsylvania, township in Pennsylvania
 Bridge in Dreher Township, bridge in Dreher Township, Wayne County, Pennsylvania
 Dreher Island State Recreation Area, park in South Carolina
 Dreher High School, high school in Columbia, South Carolina
 Jacob Wingard Dreher House, historic home in Lexington County, South Carolina
 Dreher Shoals Dam, dam in Lexington County, South Carolina

See also
 Brooklyn (cycling team), a cycling team that used the name Dreher from 1970 to 1972